Doru Mihai Pintilii (born 9 November 1984) is a Romanian former professional footballer who serves as an assistant for Liga I club FCSB.

A midfielder known for his combative playing style, Pintilii started out at Viitorul Hârlău and Auxerre Lugoj. He then appeared in over 210 top flight matches for Jiul Petroșani, Internațional Curtea de Argeș, Pandurii Târgu Jiu and FC Steaua București combined. During his career, he also had brief stints abroad with Al-Hilal and Hapoel Tel Aviv, respectively.

Internationally, Pintilii amassed 46 caps for the Romania national team between 2011 and 2018, and represented the country in the UEFA Euro 2016.

Club career

Steaua București
In May 2012, Steaua București signed Mihai Pintilii from Pandurii Târgu Jiu for undisclosed fee. They also loaned Mihai Răduț to Pandurii. On 2 March 2013, he scored two goals in a Liga I game against Gaz Metan Mediaș.

Al-Hilal
On 7 June 2014, Pintilii signed a three-year $3.9 million plus bonuses contract with Al-Hilal. He was an important part of the team that reached the final of the 2014 AFC Champions League, where Al-Hilal were defeated by Western Sydney Wanderers.

Hapoel Tel Aviv
On 19 June 2015, he signed a three-year contract with Israeli top-flight club Hapoel Tel Aviv.

International career
Pintilii made his debut for the Romania national team on 10 August 2011, in a 1–0 friendly win over San Marino.

Career statistics

Club

International

Scores and results list Romania's goal tally first, score column indicates score after each Pintilii goal.

Managerial

Honours
Auxerre Lugoj
Divizia C: 2005–06

Steaua București
Liga I: 2012–13, 2013–14
Cupa României runner-up: 2013–14
Supercupa României: 2013
Cupa Ligii: 2015–16

Al-Hilal
Saudi Crown Prince Cup runner-up: 2014–15
AFC Champions League runner-up: 2014

Pandurii Târgu Jiu
Cupa Ligii runner-up: 2014–15

References

External links

 

1984 births
Living people
Sportspeople from Iași
Romanian footballers
Association football midfielders
Liga I players
Liga II players
CSM Jiul Petroșani players
FC Internațional Curtea de Argeș players
CS Pandurii Târgu Jiu players
FC Steaua București players
Saudi Professional League players
Al Hilal SFC players
Israeli Premier League players
Hapoel Tel Aviv F.C. players
Romania international footballers
UEFA Euro 2016 players
Romanian expatriate footballers
Expatriate footballers in Saudi Arabia
Romanian expatriate sportspeople in Saudi Arabia
Expatriate footballers in Israel
Romanian expatriate sportspeople in Israel
FC Steaua București managers